Matthew Johnson (born 20 April 1994) is a New Zealand rugby union player who plays for the  in the Super Rugby competition.  His position of choice is centre.

References 

New Zealand rugby union players
1994 births
Living people
People educated at St Peter's College, Auckland
Rugby union centres
Rugby union players from Auckland